Henry Mason (June 19, 1931 – May 29, 2020) was an American professional baseball player. He began his career with the Kansas City Monarchs of the Negro American League, and was the starting pitcher in the 1954 East-West Game.

Mason was largely successful as a pitcher in the Phillies' farm system, posting 14- and 15-victory seasons in the Eastern League in 1955–56, and a 12–3 record in the International League in 1959. However, Mason's MLB debut was not auspicious. On September 12, 1958, he appeared in a one-sided Phillie loss, a 19–2 defeat at the hands of the San Francisco Giants at Connie Mack Stadium. Mason entered the game in the second inning as the Phils' third pitcher of the day — and with the Giants already ahead, 8–0. He went the next five frames and surrendered seven hits and six earned runs, although he only allowed two extra-base blows, both doubles.  He made three more appearances at the start of the 1960 Phils' season.

All told, Mason allowed 12 earned runs in four games played and 10 Major League innings, yielding 16 hits and seven bases on balls. He struck out six.  In the minors, he won 60 of 106 decisions for a .556 winning percentage.

Following his baseball career, Mason was a clergyman in Richmond, Virginia. He died on May 29, 2020.

References

External links

1931 births
2020 deaths
African-American baseball players
People from Marshall, Missouri
Baseball players from Missouri
Buffalo Bisons (minor league) players
Hawaii Islanders players
Kansas City Monarchs players
Major League Baseball pitchers
Miami Marlins (IL) players
Baseball players from Richmond, Virginia
Philadelphia Phillies players
Schenectady Blue Jays players
Syracuse Chiefs players
20th-century African-American sportspeople
21st-century African-American people